Smells Like Records is an independent record label based in Hoboken, New Jersey, formed by Sonic Youth drummer Steve Shelley in 1993. Groups that have recorded under the label include Blonde Redhead, Cat Power, The Raincoats, and The Rondelles.

The label's name comes from the 1991 hit "Smells Like Teen Spirit" by Nirvana.

Roster
 Blonde Redhead
 Bluetile Lounge
 Cat Power 
 Chris Lee
 The Clears
 Christina Rosenvinge
 Dump
 Fuck
 Hungry Ghosts
 J.P. Shilo
 John Wolfington
 La Lengua Asesina
 Lee Hazlewood
 Louis Barlow's Acoustic Sentridoh
 Mosquito
 Nod
 Overpass
 The Raincoats
 The Rondelles
 Sammy
 Scarnella
 Sentridoh
 Shelby Bryant
 Sonic Youth
 Tim Prudhomme
 Tony Scherr
 Two Dollar Guitar
 Ursa Minor

See also 
 List of record labels

External links
 Official site

American independent record labels
Record labels established in 1995
Alternative rock record labels